Sweden national beach soccer team represents Sweden in international beach soccer competitions and is controlled by the Svenska Fotbollförbundet (SvFF), the governing body for football in Sweden.

The current Swedish national beach soccer team is an unofficial national team. The team consists off players from the Swedish beach soccer team Bemmania FC who got the mandate to represent Sweden in international tournaments 2021. The unofficial national team has a mandate to represent Sweden during a trial period while the Swedish Football Association evaluates whether Sweden should have an official national team.

So far the trial period has consisted of 12 games played with 10 losses and only 2 victories for the Swedish team. In 2021, the team has scored 27 goals and conceded 42 goals with a total goal difference of minus 15.

Squad
Correct as of July 2021

Head coach: Mathias Granberg

Results

All-time record
as of 4 October 2021

Matches

External links
 Sweden, profile at Beach Soccer Worldwide
 Beach Soccer, at Swedish Football Association
 2004 results
 2013 results

European national beach soccer teams
Beach Soccer